Humphrey Napier Sturt, 2nd Baron Alington, KCVO (20 August 1859 – 30 July 1919) was a British peer and Conservative politician.

Career
Sturt was the son of Henry Sturt, 1st Baron Alington. He was elected a Member of Parliament for the East Dorset division in an 1891 by-election. In late 1902 he indicated his intention not to seek re-election, but he succeeded to the barony in February 1904 and automatically triggered another by-election.

Family
Sturt married on 25 June 1883 Lady Féodorovna Yorke, daughter of Charles Philip Yorke, 5th Earl of Hardwicke. In 1897, she was one of the guests at the Duchess of Devonshire's Diamond Jubilee Costume Ball.

They had five children.
Lois Sturt (born 25 August 1900 – 1937)
Diana Isabel Sturt (born 3 April 1884)
Sylvia Sturt (born and died 1886)
Captain Gerard Philip Montagu Napier Sturt (1893–1918) (died of wounds)
Napier George Henry Sturt, 3rd Baron Alington (1896–1940) (died of illness serving with the RAF)

References

Information taken from:

1859 births
1919 deaths
Barons Alington (third creation)
Sturt, Humphrey
Knights Commander of the Royal Victorian Order
Sturt, Humphrey
Sturt, Humphrey
Sturt, Humphrey
Sturt, Humphrey
UK MPs who inherited peerages
Eldest sons of British hereditary barons